Ikageng is a town in Dr Kenneth Kaunda District Municipality in the North West province of South Africa.

It is a Township bordering Potchefstroom. The name is Setswana and means ‘we built for ourselves’.

References

Populated places in the JB Marks Local Municipality
Townships in North West (South African province)